The Molaccan prehensile-tailed rat (Rattus morotaiensis) is a species of rodent in the family Muridae.
It is found only in the Halmahera Islands of Indonesia, including Morotai, Halmahera, and Batjan islands.

References

Rattus
Rats of Asia
Endemic fauna of Indonesia
Fauna of the Lesser Sunda Islands
Mammals described in 1945
Taxonomy articles created by Polbot